This article displays the rosters for the participating teams at the 2015 FIBA Africa Club Championship for Women.

Berco Stars

Dolphins

Ferroviário de Maputo

First Bank

INJS

I.N.S.S.

Interclube

KCC Leopards

CD Maculusso

Primeiro de Agosto

Radi

USIU Flames

See also
 2015 FIBA Africa Championship for Women squads

References

External links
 2015 FIBA Africa Champions Cup Participating Teams

FIBA Africa Women's Clubs Champions Cup squads
Basketball teams in Africa
FIBA
FIBA